This article is about a horse race located in Queensland.  For the horse race with a similar name in New South Wales, see Premier's Cup (ATC).

The Premier's Cup is a Brisbane Racing Club Group 3 Thoroughbred horse race for horses aged three years old and older, over a distance of 2200 metres under handicap conditions held at Eagle Farm Racecourse, Brisbane, Australia as part of the Queensland Winter Racing Carnival. Total prizemoney is A$125,000.

History

The inaugural running of the race was in 2006. The race is considered a major prep lead up race to the Brisbane Cup which is held several weeks after this race in June.

Distance
 2006–2014 – 2200 metres
 2015 – 2020 metres
 2016 onwards - 2200 metres

Venue
 Prior to 2016 - Doomben Racecourse
2018 - Doomben Racecourse
2020 - Doomben Racecourse

Winners

 2022 - Splendiferous
 2021 - Spirit Ridge
 2020 - Another Dollar
 2019 - The Candy Man
2018 - Rising Red
2017 - Kaiser Franz
2016 - Real Love
 2015 - Faust
 2014 - Zephyron
 2013 - Precedence
 2012 - Fantastic Blue
 2011 - Shuffle The Cash
 2010 - Tabulate
 2009 - Reggie
 2008 - Rezone
 2007 - Theseo
 2006 - Coalesce

See also
 List of Australian Group races
 Group races

References

Horse races in Australia
Open middle distance horse races
Sport in Brisbane